Jaeggi is a surname. Notable people with the surname include:

Hugo Jaeggi (1936–2018), Swiss photographer
Rahel Jaeggi (born 1967), Swiss philosopher, daughter of Urs
Urs Jaeggi (1931–2021), Swiss sociologist, painter, and author

See also
Jaggi